Coleotechnites bacchariella, the coyote brush twig borer moth, is a moth of the family Gelechiidae. It is found in the United States, where it has been recorded from California.

The larvae bore the twigs of Baccharis pilularis.

References

Moths described in 1927
Coleotechnites